Marzi is a town and comune in the province of Cosenza in the Calabria region of southern Italy.

Notable people 
 Mauro Fiore, Italian-American cinematographer
 Stanley Tucci, American actor and filmmaker, has his origins in Marzi
 Christine Tucci, American actress and sister of Stanley Tucci, has hers origins in Marzi

See also
 Savuto river

References

Cities and towns in Calabria